Vatana is a town and commune in Madagascar. It belongs to the district of Manakara, which is a part of Vatovavy-Fitovinany Region. The population of the commune was estimated to be approximately 10,000 in 2001 commune census.

Only primary schooling is available. The town provides access to hospital services to its citizens. The majority 99.5% of the population of the commune are farmers.  The most important crops are coffee and rice; also cassava is an important agricultural product. Services provide employment for 0.5% of the population.

References and notes 

Populated places in Vatovavy-Fitovinany